Ross E. Householder House is at 431 Spring Street, Kingman, Arizona. The house was built in 1916–23. The house is Bungalow/Craftsman style.  It was evaluated for National Register listing as part of a 1985 study of 63 historic resources in Kingman that led to this and many others being listed.

The house was built by R. E. Householder. Mr. Householder was a mining engineer who owned his own business of civil and mining engineering from 1919 to 1940. During the 1930s, he was the Mohave County Engineer. He did serve in the Arizona Legislature.

References

Houses completed in 1920
Houses in Kingman, Arizona
Houses on the National Register of Historic Places in Arizona
National Register of Historic Places in Kingman, Arizona